Tower Bersama Group or widely known as "TBG", is one of the  largest telecommunication tower provider in Indonesia.

History
Since  2003 with the establishment of PT United Towerindo, TBG has been  providing coverage solutions and continually expanding its infrastructure  portfolio through build-to-suit developments and acquisition of existing tower  portfolios and tower companies.

The  companies making up the Tower Bersama Group are PT Tower Bersama, PT United Towerindo, PT  Telenet Internusa, PT Batavia Towerindo, PT Bali Telekom, PT Prima Media  Selaras and PT Triaka Bersama. Each of these companies is seamlessly managed  under the one management of Tower Bersama Group.

Mergers and acquisitions
Below are the companies that making up the TBG :
1. PT. United Towerindo
2. PT. Telenet Internusa
3. PT. Tower Bersama
4. PT. Triaka Bersama
5. PT. Batavia Towerindo
6. PT. Bali Telekom
7. PT. Prima Media Selaras
8. PT. Solu Sindo Kreasi Pratama (Indonesian Tower)
9. PT. Mitrayasa Sarana Informasi (Infratel)
10. PT. Towerindo Konvergensi
11. PT. Metric Solusi Integrasi
12. PT. Tower One

On August 9, 2011 TBG acquire 100% stake in PT. Mitarayasa Sarana Informasi worth Rp 200 billion.

References

External links
Official web site

Companies established in 2003